Křenovice is a municipality and village in Přerov District in the Olomouc Region of the Czech Republic. It has about 400 inhabitants.

Notable people
Rostislav Vojáček (born 1949), footballer

References

Villages in Přerov District